The following is a list of players, both past and current, who appeared at least in one game for the Kaohsiung 17LIVE Steelers (2021–present) franchise.



Players

B

C

D

H

J

K

L

N

O

P

S

T

W

Y

References

P. League+ all-time rosters